Aryabhatta Knowledge University (AKU Patna) is a collegiate public state university located in Mithapur, Patna, Bihar, India. It was named after the Indian astronomer Aryabhatta.

Apart from a few notable exceptions, AKU has authority over technical education all over the state of Bihar, and it functions as the state technological university of Bihar. It is recognised and approved by AICTE. It is a statutory requirement for colleges offering any program in engineering, medical or technology in the state to be affiliated with the university. It also has four schools:
 Centre for Geographical studies.
 Centre for River studies.
 Centre for Journalism and Mass Communication.
 Patliputra School of Economics.

Campus
The university operates from its own office in Mithapur, Patna.

History 
The university was established in 2010 by the Government of Bihar through the Aryabhatta Knowledge University Act, 2008. It was established for the development and management of educational infrastructure related to technical education, medical, management and allied professional education in Bihar.

Affiliated colleges

In the session 2020–21, university has 56 Engineering and pharmacy colleges, 15 medical colleges, 33 educational colleges, 8 community colleges, 36 nursing colleges and 11 vocational colleges.

Engineering and pharmacy colleges
The Engineering and pharmacy colleges under Aryabhatta Knowledge University include.

Medical colleges
The Medical colleges under Aryabhatta Knowledge University include.

Pharmacy colleges 
The Pharmacy colleges under Aryabhatta Knowledge University include.

Educational colleges

Vocational & professional college 
The Vocational and Professional colleges under Aryabhatta Knowledge University include.
Vidya Vihar Institute of Technology, Purnia
Ambedkar Institute of Higher Education, Danapur, Patna AKU Website
Cimage Professional College, Patna
Sityog Institute of Technology, Aurangabad
Azmet Institute of Technology, Kishanganj
Adwaita Mission Institute of Technology, Banka
Moti Babu Institute of Technology, Forebesganj
Mamta Institute of Education, Siwan AKU link
Siwan Engineering & Technology, Siwan
R.P. Sharma Institute of Technology, Patna
St. Xavier's College of Management & Technology, Patna
Cimage Professional College, Patna
IMPACT, Patna
International School of Management, Patna
Indian Institute of Business Management, Patna
Ganga Global Institute of Management Studies, Begusarai
Lalit Narayan Mishra Institute of Economic Development & Social Change, Patna
Magadh Professional Institute, Rupaspur-Digha Nahar Road, Patna

See also

 Education in Bihar
 Education in India
 List of educational institutions in Patna
 List of institutions of higher education in Bihar

References

https://www.telegraphindia.com/bihar/talk-of-new-courses-at-aku-anniversary/cid/1438485

External links

Educational institutions established in 2008
2008 establishments in Bihar
Universities in Patna
Aryabhatta Knowledge University